Cornelis Bernardus "Kees" Bastiaans (20 November 1909, Mill, Netherlands – 31 March 1986, Mill) was a Dutch painter. He was an Expressionist, often with a religious theme to his work. One of his paintings Familieportret is exhibited in the Noordbrabants Museum in 's-Hertogenbosch.

External links
 Biography
 Official website

1909 births
1986 deaths
People from Mill en Sint Hubert
20th-century Dutch painters
Dutch male painters
20th-century Dutch male artists